This is a list of media in Brandon, Manitoba, Canada.

Radio stations

Brandon University has a closed-circuit campus radio station, which uses the informal call sign "CQBU", but this station does not currently broadcast on terrestrial radio.

Interlake Broadcast Group has an Internet-only radio station based in Brandon, playing an Adult Contemporary format. The station broadcasts 24/7 at channel1radio.com.

Television
All local aerial television in Brandon are analogue rebroadcasters of stations from Winnipeg. The first DTV channel is expected to be CKND-DT-2 in October, 2013:

Cable television in Brandon is served by Westman Cable, which operates a local community channel, WCGtv, on cable channel 12.

Until 2009, Brandon had only one locally based terrestrial television station, CKX-TV, which originated programming locally. The station was primarily a CBC Television affiliate, but also aired some programming from the A-Channel system owned by CTVglobemedia. CKX-TV closed down on October 2, 2009, after a deal to sell the station to an investor fell through. CBC service in Brandon is still available on Westman Cable channel 6, which was taken over by CBWT, after the closure of CKX-TV.

Print
Brandon has three regular local newspapers. The Brandon Sun is a daily paper, News in a Minute is a daily coffee shop paper and the Westman Journal is a weekly paper. The Sun also produces two "community" editions that are distributed throughout Westman on Thursdays.

Students at Brandon University are served by the student newspaper The Quill, while Assiniboine Community College students are served by the monthly Student Focus newsletter.

The nominal Winnipeg edition of The Globe and Mail was at one time printed in Brandon.

References

Brandon
 
Media, Brandon